Michael Barry Tabor (born 28 October 1941) is a British businessman, bookmaker, gambler and owner of thoroughbred racehorses.

Tabor regularly appears on the Sunday Times Rich List of the richest people in Britain.  In 2012 his fortune was estimated to be £550 million;
two years previously the business magazine Management Today had suggested it was $2 billion. According to the Sunday Times Rich List in 2019 his net worth was estimated at £629 million.

Early life

Michael Tabor was brought up in Forest Gate in east London, the son of a glassmaker. Tabor's grandparents were Russian-Jewish immigrants, originally called Taborosky, who had moved to London from Vilna, Russia. He was educated at East Ham Grammar School, leaving when he was 15 to get a job in the local Co-op. He was nearly a hairdresser, enrolling at the Morris School of Hairdressing in Piccadilly, but instead turned to bookmaking. Tabor's father had for a time been in partnership with a bookmaker at Romford Greyhound Stadium and Tabor himself became interested in gambling in his teens, spending Monday and Friday afternoons at Hendon's greyhound stadium in north London and regularly attending the track at White City.

Bookmaking business

Tabor worked for commission agents and credit bookmakers before setting up in business for himself in 1968.  He borrowed £30,000 from a financier to buy two bankrupt betting shops from Andrew Gordon, retaining the name Arthur Prince and expanding the business until he owned a chain of 114 shops. In 1995 he sold the business to Coral for a reported £27 million. "There's an old saying I like," Tabor said, "which is that good punters make good bookmakers. I have found that to be very true."

Betting

Tabor gained a reputation as a shrewd, daring and successful gambler, whose actions could dramatically affect the odds being offered on a horse. Speculation in the press linked him to bets of tens of thousands of pounds. His later horseracing associate, Derrick Smith, told The Racing Post that when he was working with Ladbrokes in the 1980s they had to stop taking Tabor's bets.

Horseracing

Tabor's first horse was Tornado Prince, bought for £2,850 in 1973.  He bought several more, including Royal Derbi, trained, as was Tornado Prince, by Neville Callaghan in Newmarket.

His great successes as an owner, however, came in association with the expert Irish horsemen connected to the Coolmore Stud of John Magnier.  In 1994 Tabor paid more than $400,000 for the promising two-year-old thoroughbred Thunder Gulch.  The horse went on to win the Kentucky Derby, the Belmont Stakes and the Travers Stakes, narrowly missing the American Triple Crown when he was beaten by less than a length in the Preakness Stakes.  Tabor had been looking for a horse to race in America having moved to Miami, Florida, and had been pointed for advice to John Magnier by a mutual friend, J.P. McManus.  Demi O'Byrne, the bloodstock adviser to Magnier, advised Tabor on his purchase and Magnier bought half of Thunder Gulch to stand at stud at Coolmore's Kentucky annexe at Ashford.

Tabor joined the Coolmore partnership.  His money allowed Magnier to become once again a major buyer in the top yearling sales, a role he had not played since the mid-1980s when he had acted in conjunction with Robert Sangster and other associates.  In 1995 they bought three of the top four yearlings at the Keeneland Sales and paid 600,000 guineas for the leading lot at Tattersalls' Houghton Sale.  That colt, Entrepreneur, went on to win the 2,000 Guineas at Newmarket.

Tabor became the owner and co-owner of an extraordinary catalogue of some of the world's best racehorses, generally owning the Coolmore horses in a three-way partnership with Magnier and his wife Sue, and with another former London bookmaker, Derrick Smith, who became involved in the mid-2000s. His Desert King won the Irish 2,000 Guineas and the Irish Derby in 1997, while Entrepreneur took the 2,000 Guineas at Newmarket that same year to give Tabor his first victory in an English Classic. Montjeu won the Irish Derby and the Prix de l'Arc de Triomphe in 1999, while Tabor won The Derby in 2001 and 2002 with Galileo and then High Chaparral, the latter horse also winning the Irish Derby and the Breeders' Cup Turf. Tabor won the Derby again, with Pour Moi in 2011 and with Camelot in 2012, the year that horse also took the 2,000 Guineas and the Irish Derby at the Curragh, though he missed out on the English Triple Crown by finishing second in the St Leger. Tabor was also the breeder, as well as the owner, of Giant's Causeway, winner of numerous Group One races, and in 1995 his Hurricane Run was voted the world's top-ranked racehorse by the International Federation of Horseracing Authorities.  His Derby victories made Tabor one of only four men to have raced a winner of both the Epsom and the Kentucky Derbies; the others are Paul Mellon, John W. Galbreath and Prince Ahmed bin Salman.

Tabor acknowledged the superiority of his Irish associates in their judgment of horses, telling The Independent: "I enjoy going round looking at the horses and I like to think I've got a fair idea. But I don't know a lot really and a little knowledge is dangerous." Discussing the economics of Coolmore's extremely successful breeding operation, Tabor said: "I get enormous pleasure out of the horses but, it goes without saying, that you're trying to make stallions. You need a stallion, maybe a stallion and a half, every year."

Other business interests
In May 2014 Tabor assumed a 100% control of Victor Chandler International after Victor Chandler sold his interest in the firm.

His racing associations have also extended into other areas of business.  With Magnier, Derrick Smith and J.P. McManus, Tabor is one of the co-owners of the luxury Sandy Lane hotel in Barbados. In addition, Tabor, Magnier, McManus, and another Irish associate and Sandy Lane owner, Dermot Desmond, collectively owned 60 per cent of the Next Generation chain of fitness clubs sold to London & Regional Properties for around £200 million in 2006. Tabor, Magnier, Smith, McManus and the currency trader Joe Lewis also own a large stake in the Mitchells & Butlers pub chain. This group of businessmen is also reported to have profited extensively from currency speculation, activity sometimes attributed to their association with Lewis.

In 2008 the company Global Radio, founded by Tabor's son, Ashley, took over GCap Media, owners of Capital Radio and Classic FM. The move was backed with £375 million from investors including Magnier, McManus, and Tabor. The deal made Global Radio the largest radio group in the United Kingdom.

Tabor's other business dealings include an investment in two London hotels and a failed attempt in 1996 to buy West Ham United football club, whom he has supported since he was a boy.

Personal life
Tabor divides his time between Monte Carlo, and Barbados. He has been married, to Doreen, since 1975. They have a son, Ashley Tabor.

References

1941 births
Living people
Sportspeople from London
British businesspeople
British Jews
British racehorse owners and breeders
Owners of Epsom Derby winners
Owners of Kentucky Derby winners
Owners of Prix de l'Arc de Triomphe winners